Seyfi Havaeri (17 July 1920 – 24 January 2009) was a Turkish actor, screenwriter and film director.

Selected filmography
 Damga (1948)
 The Victory Sun (1953)

References

Bibliography 
 Gönül Dönmez-Colin. The Routledge Dictionary of Turkish Cinema. Routledge, 2013.

External links 
 

1920 births
2009 deaths
Film people from Istanbul
Turkish male screenwriters
Turkish film directors
Turkish male film actors
Turkish male stage actors
20th-century screenwriters